Carlton is a small rural parish located East of the river Sence in Leicestershire, England, around 2.2 miles North of   Market Bosworth. According to the 2011 Census, Carlton has a population of 305 However, from 2014 it is estimated that there are around 330 people living there with a total of 283 registered electors. There are four roads in Carlton:
Main Street (where most of the population is centred)
Barton Road (at the east end of the village leading south to Market Bosworth and north to Barton-in-the-Beans)
Congerstone Lane (at the west end of the village)
Shackerstone Walk (formerly Occupation Road).

Village life 
The village has a strong community spirit, and there are regular fundraising events for causes such as the church. There is an Investment Club which meets in members' houses once a month. The local fox hunt often meets in one of the farms on Shackerstone Walk. The Community also gets involved in other events such as the spring clean litter pick which has been going on annually since 1992. the day involves the clearing of all roads and verges leading up to the village to welcome spring. Most recently a total of 30 local people took part.

Facilities 
The village has one pub, The Gate Hangs Well, situated at the eastern end of Carlton. This pub now features a cafe and restaurant called Seasons, and is privately owned. The village is in Leicestershire, but the post office mail is delivered from Nuneaton, so Carlton's Post office address is Carlton, Nuneaton, CV13. The Parish is also crossed by the Leicestershire round circular paths, a 100-mile circular walk around the county connecting many places of historical and geographical interest. Therefore, the parish council works closely with the Carlton footpath group and the county council.

St Andrews Church 
St Andrews today is a small pretty church situated in the centre of Carlton restored after it was burnt down in 1764 with a mixture of both stone and brick and was dedicated to St Michael  Then in 1867 another restoration took place undertaken buy Goddard and Son. The restoration involved both altering the windows and adding a saddleback top to the tower.. The building was Gothicised and its dedication was then changed to St Andrew. In the Northern Wall of the nave there is a stained glass window picturing the angels Michael and Gabriel created in the 1920s by Theadora Salusbury. In 1937 the clock tower was bought through the efforts of the rector's daughter selling needle work door to door, and this needlework continues as some of the villagers produced some commemorative pieces in order to celebrate the Millennium.

History of Carlton 
The village's name means 'farm/settlement of the free peasants'.

There is no mention of the parish in the doomsday book so it is likely a Norman settlement However the first Civil registration occurred in 1837, with the parish being registered in the Market Bosworth Sub-District. and from then Carlton was described as a chapelry in Market-Bosworth parish, Leicester; on the Ashby-de-la-Zouch canal.

In 1847, saw the Carltons first Public elementary school to be built, intending to educate 49 children other facilities were also built or revived including the St Andrews church, a Manor house in 1881 and the diamond jubilee orchard.

The population itself according to recent Census data has stayed relatively the same apart from dropping below 200 between 1901s data and 1961, and hitting a lowest of 170 in 1921, with the number of Males dropping to 84. Memorials of those who died in the war can be seen in St Andrew's church.

Local Businesses 

Apart from one pub, the main businesses are based in Market Bosworth, and other areas of Nuneaton which are still accessible from the Parish. There is a small commercial estate located behind Church Cottage, which includes businesses such as AR Demolition.

Transport 
Arriva Midlands operate service 153 at hourly intervals through the village with journeys terminating in nearby Market Bosworth and continuing into Leicester. The nearest train station is Leicester railway station which is nearly 20 miles away

References

Villages in Leicestershire
Civil parishes in Leicestershire
Hinckley and Bosworth